Thomas Steven English (born 18 October 1961) is an English former professional footballer, most notably for Coventry City, Leicester City and Colchester United. Between 1979 and 1990 he made 174 appearances in the Football League, scoring 42 league goals.

Biography
English was born in Cirencester, Gloucestershire and attended school in Colchester, Essex. He began his career as an apprentice at Coventry City. After making 66 league appearances for Coventry, scoring seventeen times, he signed for Leicester City in 1982. After being released in 1984, he made a handful of appearances for Rochdale and Plymouth Argyle as a non-contract player, before signing for Colchester United in 1985. After playing a single game for Colchester he signed for Australian club Canberra City where he was the club's joint top scorer in his only season before returning to Colchester in November.

He left Colchester in 1987 and played for non-League clubs Wealdstone and Bishop's Stortford, before returning to Colchester for a third time in 1989. In 1990, he signed for Hong Kong club Happy Valley, before returning to England to play for Crawley Town, Wivenhoe Town, Sudbury Town and Harwich & Parkeston before retiring in 1999.

His son, Tom, played for the youth teams at Norwich City and Arsenal, and professionally in Singapore for one season.

References

External links
 Tommy English at Colchester United Archive Database

1961 births
Living people
People from Cirencester
English footballers
Coventry City F.C. players
Leicester City F.C. players
Rochdale A.F.C. players
Plymouth Argyle F.C. players
Colchester United F.C. players
Canberra City FC players
National Soccer League (Australia) players
Expatriate soccer players in Australia
Wealdstone F.C. players
Bishop's Stortford F.C. players
Happy Valley AA players
English expatriate sportspeople in Australia
English expatriate sportspeople in Hong Kong
Crawley Town F.C. players
Wivenhoe Town F.C. players
Cornard United F.C. players
Sudbury Town F.C. players
Harwich & Parkeston F.C. players
Expatriate footballers in Hong Kong
Footballers from Gloucestershire
Association football forwards